MuslimFest is an annual three-day festival that celebrates the best in Muslim Art, Culture, and Entertainment. The event showcases Muslim artists, musicians, and comedians, and takes place every summer in Mississauga, Ontario. MuslimFest is a signature event in Canada that won various awards including Top 100 by FEO and also Greenest Festival in Canada award.  The 2022 event will take place at the Mississauga Celebration Square from Sep 02 to Sep 04.

General features of the event include several educational workshops, a variety show, puppet show, programs geared towards women, and an international bazaar. Programs held during the day have typically consisted of an international art exhibit, film competition, and fashion show. A performance finale at the end of the final day typically includes spoken word artists, Muslim musicians and nasheed artists, and a comedy show. MuslimFest organizers claim that the event has attracted over 65,000 visitors over the course of three days.

About
Launched in 2004, MuslimFest is an annual cultural festival that brings together Muslims from all over Canada and even the US. MuslimFest has played a large role in encouraging arts and entertainment as well as showcasing the diversity of Islamic culture and identity. MuslimFest is a celebration of the intersection of religion and culture.

MuslimFest is organized by a team of young dedicated volunteers that come from various backgrounds and experiences, high-school students are encouraged to volunteer to get their community hours and also learn skills that will help them with their careers.

Opening Ceremony 
The festival will begin at 12:00 p.m. on Friday with Friday Prayer with the annual Canada National Flag Unveiling Ceremony and a children’s choir singing the national anthem.

Entertainment
The festival stages will be busy with a full line-up of entertainers scheduled for the event. Amal Kassir and Labibah will present their poetry and spoken word pieces. Boonaa Mohamed, Illyas Mao, & Abdullah Bustami will entertain festival guests with their musical performances. Comedians Nadira from NYC and Spoken word by Ammar Al Shukry will keep guests laughing on Saturday night.

The Fortunate Slave – Play
A prominent Fulani Muslim prince from West Africa was kidnapped to the Americas during the Atlantic slave trade. He was released due to an English humanitarian’s intervention and lived in England along with the nobility before returning home to Senegal.

Art Battle
The ‘Battle of the Brushes' is a painting competition between artists who will create works of art LIVE in a bid to win and wow the audience with their talents.

International Bazaar
Those attending the event will have the chance to browse and shop at many unique vendors over the weekend. There will be a Fragrant Oils Boutique and vendors selling Turkish clothing, Middle Eastern ornaments, Turkish lanterns, and more.

Workshops
On Saturday and Sunday, festival attendees can learn how to create Phulkari Embroidery, Calligraphy, Water Marble, and Hacer Ozcan Style Water Marble.  Registration for workshops is based on a first-come-first-served basis. In addition to the workshops, there will be an arts and crafts tent and carnival games where children and families can drop by throughout the day.

Flavors of World Food Festival
Taste buds will be delighted by the food offerings at MuslimFest with food from various parts of the world.

Art Exhibit
The Art Exhibit at Muslimfest to immerse yourself in talented artwork from all backgrounds, with three different age groups - explore some of our local artists!

A Night of Nasheeds
MuslimFest invites you to come out for a night surrounded by creative cultural and spiritual music.

Poetry Night - Park Bench Chroncicles
MuslimFest brings you an exciting play, Park Bench Chronicles, filled with poetry and comedy featuring talented artists Ammar Alshukary, Bonna Muhammad, Bustami, Essam, Ilyaas Mao, and Yousef Kroma.

Performers and Artists
Maher Zain
Humood AlKhudher
Amal Kassir
Waseem Badami
Faisal Salah
Khaled Siddiq
Mustaqeem
Yahya Hawwa
Boonaa Mohamed
Junaid Jamshed
Dawud Wharnsby
Saleem Hameed
Idris Phillips
Zain Bhikha
Khaleel Muhammad
The Fletcher Valve Drummers
Irfan Makki
Ilyas Mao
Preacher Moss, of Allah Made Me Funny fame
Amir Sulaiman
Native Deen
seven8six (786 Boyz)
Baba Ali
Aman Ali
The Sound of Reason
Sofia Baig
Azhar Usman of Allah Made Me Funny fame
Rasul Somji
Mo Amer, of Allah Made Me Funny fame
Azeem Muhammad, formerly of Allah Made Me Funny fame
Mezba Mahtab
Brother Dash
Adam Saleh

See also
Global Peace and Unity

External links
MuslimFest official website
MuslimFest profile, Festivals & Events Ontario
MuslimFest 2005 overview
Omni news report about MuslimFest
MuslimFest 2005 Concert overview
MuslimFest 2005 Gallery
MuslimFest 2007 Gallery
MuslimFest artist Mezba Mahtab

Festivals in Ontario
Islam in Canada